Phyllidia undula is a species of sea slug, a dorid nudibranch, a shell-less marine gastropod mollusk in the family Phyllidiidae.

Description
This species has previously been confused with Phyllidia ocellata.

Distribution
This species was described from the Red Sea. It appears to be confined to the western Indian Ocean including the Red Sea, the African coast and the Island of Réunion.

Diet
This species feeds on a sponge.

References

Phyllidiidae
Gastropods described in 1986